Bellecourt is a surname, and may refer to:

Clyde Bellecourt (1936=2022), Native American rights activist
George-Antoine Bellecourt (1803–1874), Canadian priest and missionary
Gustave Duchesne de Bellecourt (1817–1881), 19th century French diplomat who was active in Asia
Sylvie Bouchet Bellecourt (born 1957), French politician
Vernon Bellecourt (1931–2007), Native American rights activist

See also 
 Bellecour (actor), French actor
 Belle Court Apartments, Oregon, United States
 Belcourt of Newport, Rhode Island, United States
 Bell Court, Lexington, Kentucky, United States
 Bellicourt, France
 Bellecourt, Wallonia, a district of the municipality of Manage, Belgium

Surnames
French-language surnames
Surnames of French origin
Native American families
Native American surnames